Pompeius (Greek: Πομπήιος, died 532) was a politician of the Eastern Roman Empire and nephew of the Emperor Anastasius I (reigned 491–518).  His family gained political prominence with the accession of Anastasius.  Pompeius was consul in 501, and was elevated to the patricianate, probably by Anastasius.  He held military office, serving in the Iberian War.  He married a woman named Anastasia, and had at least one son.   In 532, Pompeius' brother Hypatius was acclaimed emperor by the rioters during the Nika riots; after the riots were put down, both Hypatius and Pompeius were executed.

Family 

He was a son of Secundinus and Caesaria. His mother was a sister of Anastasius I. His father served as Eparch of Constantinople (c. 492) and Roman consul in 511. Secundinus also held the rank of patrician. The main sources for the career of Secundinus are John of Antioch and Theophanes the Confessor. The latter preserved fragments of Theodorus Lector which cover Secundinus. Joannes Laurentius Lydus briefly mentions the consulship of Secundinus as a chronological reference.

John Malalas and Theophanes identify Secundinus as the father of Hypatius. Hypatius and Pompeius are identified as brothers by Procopius, therefore sharing the same parents.

Anastasius and his extended family were Illyrians of obscure origins. When Anastasius rose to the throne, his family gained access to high-ranking military and political positions. His brother Paulus, his brother-in-law Secundinus and nephews Hypatius, Pompeius and Probus all became consuls, with Hypatius at least becoming a magister militum. Irene, a daughter of Paulus, married Anicius Olybrius. Her husband was a son of Anicia Juliana and through her a descendant of the Theodosian dynasty. The marriage was likely arranged to further secure Anastasius on his throne. Other women of the family married Sabinianus and Moschianus who also became consuls. Consuls Anastasius Paulus Probus Sabinianus Pompeius Anastasius and Anastasius Paulus Probus Moschianus Probus Magnus were among the youngest members of this family and their names reflect those of several older relatives.

Life 

The Chronicon Paschale mentions Pompeius as Roman consul in 501, serving alongside Avienus. He is also known to have served as a military commander to the troops of the Diocese of Thrace during the reign of his uncle. His military career is considered part of a pattern of family patronage employed by most Emperors and Empresses of the period. The families promoted in this way could then remain influential long after the deaths of their imperial relatives.

Marcellinus Comes reports that Pompeius' house at Constantinople was burnt down during the anti-monophysite riots of 512. Considering Pompeius himself was a Chalcedonian, he was probably not specifically targeted. His religious affiliation was recorded by Cyril of Scythopolis and Theophanes. He was known to have been acquainted with Sabbas the Sanctified in 511–512. He also provided assistance to the deposed Patriarch Macedonius II of Constantinople during the latter's exile.

Romana by Jordanes records that Pompeius and his troops suffered defeat at a battle near Adrianople, facing foreign invaders. While the event can be dated to c. 517, the context is unclear. The invaders are not identified, though this could be part of the ongoing invasion of the Antae. This invasion is known to have taken place at approximately the same time.

He supported negotiation with Pope Hormisdas over the Acacian schism. In 519, Pompeius, Vitalian and Justinian (the future emperor) met the papal envoys at some distance from Constantinople and escorted them for the rest of the way. He also maintained correspondence with Hormisdas during that year.

While Cyril of Scythopolis, John Malalas and the Chronicon Paschale all agree that Pompeius held the rank of patrician during the late 520s, it is unknown when he gained the title. It is considered likely that this would be another act of favor from Anastasius, rather than Justin I or Justinian I. In any case, Malalas reports that patrician Pompeius was involved in the Iberian War. In 528, Pompeius led reinforcements consisting of Illyrians, Scythians, Thracians and Isaurians towards the Persian front. They presumably arrived late in the campaign season, because the text goes on to say that hostilities ceased for the winter. His military rank at the time is uncertain. Hypatius was the magister militum per Orientem, so Pompeius could have held the ranks of magister militum praesentales or magister militum vacans.

Pompeius figures prominently in Procopius' account of the Nika riots (532): "On the fifth day of the insurrection in the late afternoon the Emperor Justinian gave orders to Hypatius and Pompeius, nephews of the late emperor, Anastasius, to go home as quickly as possible, either because he suspected that some plot was being matured by them against his own person, or, it may be, because destiny brought them to this. But they feared that the people would force them to the throne (as in fact fell out), and they said that they would be doing wrong if they should abandon their sovereign when he found himself in such danger. When the Emperor Justinian heard this, he inclined still more to his suspicion, and he bade them quit the palace instantly. Thus, then, these two men betook themselves to their homes, and, as long as it was night, they remained there quietly."

"But on the following day at sunrise it became known to the people that both men had quit the palace where they had been staying. So the whole population ran to them, and they declared Hypatius emperor and prepared to lead him to the market-place to assume the power. But the wife of Hypatius, Mary, a discreet woman, who had the greatest reputation for prudence, laid hold of her husband and would not let go, but cried out with loud lamentation and with entreaties to all her kinsmen that the people were leading him on the road to death. But since the throng overpowered her, she unwillingly released her husband, and he by no will of his own came to the Forum of Constantine, where they summoned him to the throne; then since they had neither diadem nor anything else with which it is customary for a king to be clothed, they placed a golden necklace upon his head and proclaimed him Emperor of the Romans."

The Riots resulted in the executions of both Hypatius and Pompeius. "Then indeed from both sides the partisans of Hypatius were assailed with might and main and destroyed. When the rout had become complete and there had already been great slaughter of the populace, Boraedes and Justus, nephews of the Emperor Justinian, without anyone daring to lift a hand against them, dragged Hypatius down from the throne, and, leading him in, handed him over together with Pompeius to the emperor. And there perished among the populace on that day more than thirty thousand. But the emperor commanded the two prisoners to be kept in severe confinement. Then, while Pompeius was weeping and uttering pitiable words (for the man was wholly inexperienced in such misfortunes), Hypatius reproached him at length and said that those who were about to die unjustly should not lament. For in the beginning they had been forced by the people against their will, and afterwards they had come to the hippodrome with no thought of harming the emperor."

"And the soldiers killed both of them on the following day and threw their bodies into the sea. The emperor confiscated all their property for the public treasury, and also that of all the other members of the senate who had sided with them. Later, however, he restored to the children of Hypatius and Pompeius and to all others the titles which they had formerly held, and as much of their property as he had not happened to bestow upon his friends." The execution is confirmed by Marcellinus Comes, Zacharias Rhetor, Evagrius Scholasticus, John Malalas,  the Chronicon Paschale, Victor of Tunnuna, Theophanes the Confessor, and Joannes Zonaras.

John Bagnell Bury noted "that The Emperor, suspicious though he was, probably believed that they were not morally guilty, but feared that they would be used as tools in future conspiracies. They were too dangerous to be allowed to live, but their children were spared."

Marriage and children 

Pompeius was married to Anastasia. She was already known as a fervent Chalcedonian Christian and philanthropist by the time of his death. She had personally met Sabbas the Sanctified in 511/512 and maintained correspondence with Pope Hormisdas, the latter mainly concerning the Acacian schism. She later founded a monastery located on the Mount of Olives and retired there as its abbess. Anastasia was one of the sources used by Cyril of Scythopolis. While named Anastasia and a patricia by rank, she should be distinguished from her contemporary Anastasia the Patrician.

Pompeius and Anastasia had at least one son, whose name is not known. Modern genealogical theories have suggested that the couple could be parents or ancestors to later Byzantine figures such as John Mystacon, Nicetas and Epiphania, the mother of Heraclius, but this remains unconfirmed.

References

Sources

External links 
Profile of Secundinus in the Prosopography of the later Roman Empire
Chronicon Paschale, Ludwig August Dindorf edition (1832)

532 deaths
6th-century Byzantine people
6th-century Roman consuls
Patricii
Imperial Roman consuls
Executed Byzantine people
Year of birth unknown
6th-century executions by the Byzantine Empire